Moulins Cathedral is a Roman Catholic church located in the town of Moulins, Allier, France. It is also known as Notre-Dame de Moulins.

The cathedral is the seat of the Bishop of Moulins. It is a national monument.

The cathedral contains two distinct building phases four centuries apart. It was constructed as a collegiate church in the Flamboyant style at the end of the 15th century. In 1822 it was made a cathedral. To this a neo-Gothic nave, designed by the architects Lassus and Millet, was added at the end of the 19th century.

The treasury contains the famous triptych by the Maître de Moulins, which was commissioned around 1500 by the Duke of Bourbon.

References

External links

Location

Roman Catholic cathedrals in France
Churches in Allier
Basilica churches in France
Buildings and structures in Moulins, Allier